Beautheil-Saints is a commune in the Seine-et-Marne department in the Île-de-France region in north-central France. It was established on 1 January 2019 by merger of the former communes of Saints (the seat) and Beautheil.

See also
Communes of the Seine-et-Marne department

References

Communes of Seine-et-Marne
Communes nouvelles of Seine-et-Marne
Populated places established in 2019
2019 establishments in France